John Nathaniel Williams (27 January 1878 – 25 April 1915) was an English cricketer. He played for Hawke's Bay in 1903 and Gloucestershire in 1908.

The son of Sir Robert Williams, Williams was educated at Eton and Oxford University. He went to New Zealand, where he worked in the gold mining industry at Waihi. He enlisted in the New Zealand armed forces as a private, and was killed in action at Gallipoli on 25 April 1915 during the Landing at Anzac Cove.

References

External links
 Cenotaph Record, John Nathaniel Williams
 John Williams at CricketArchive
 Private Williams of Hawke’s Bay

1878 births
1915 deaths
English cricketers
Gloucestershire cricketers
Sportspeople from Kensington
Cricketers from Greater London
New Zealand military personnel killed in World War I
Dorset cricketers
Hawke's Bay cricketers
People educated at Eton College
Alumni of the University of Oxford
English emigrants to New Zealand
Military personnel from London
New Zealand military personnel of World War I
New Zealand Army personnel